3Below: Tales of Arcadia (or simply 3Below) is an American computer-animated science fantasy television series produced by DreamWorks Animation, and is the second installment of Guillermo del Toro's Tales of Arcadia trilogy.

The series was announced on December 12, 2017 by Netflix and DreamWorks. On October 5, 2018, the premiere date was announced and the first teaser was released. The 13-episode first season was released on December 21, 2018 on Netflix. The series concluded with the release of the second season on July 12, 2019.

A third and final installment of Tales of Arcadia, titled Wizards, was released on August 7, 2020. The full-length feature film, Trollhunters: Rise of the Titans was released on Netflix on July 21, 2021.

Plot
Two royal extraterrestrial siblings, Crown Princess Aja and Crown Prince Krel of House Tarron, their doglike pet named Luug, and their bodyguard, Varvatos Vex, escape from their home planet of Akiridion-5 after a coup and crash-land on Earth, specifically in the city of Arcadia Oaks, California. There, the aliens adjust to human culture and try to fix their spaceship (as well as to restore their nearly-dead parents King Fialkov and Queen Coranda) to return and take back Akiridion-5, which is being taken over by an evil dictator known as General Val Morando, who has already sent out a team of intergalactic bounty hunters, called the Zeron Brotherhood, to find and catch the alien prince and princess.

After investigating a way to stop Val Morando and find the hiding place of Aja and Krel, Zadra, one of the noble protectors of the royals from Akiridion-5, arrives on Earth. Meanwhile, after learning of his involvement in Morando's coup, Aja and Krel decide to exile Vex. During his exile, Vex is captured by the Zeron Brotherhood and imprisoned at a bounty hunter outpost located on Earth's moon. In Season 2, Aja and Krel learn of his capture and launch a rescue mission. Soon after the rescue, however the gang discovers that Morando is heading for Earth. After successfully defeating him, Aja (now Queen), Vex, Zadra, Luug and the rest finally return home, joined by Eli, who has volunteered to be Earth's ambassador on Akiridion 5. Crown Prince Krel decides that Earth has become his home, and decides to stay with his new human best friends.

Voice cast

Princess Aja and Crown Prince Krel also appeared in the Trollhunters episodes "In Good Hands", and "The Eternal Knight Pt. 1" in their borrowed human forms.

Episodes

Season 1 (2018)

Season 2 (2019)

Reception

Critical response 
The series currently holds a 100% on Rotten Tomatoes. It has been praised for its depiction of immigration through a sci-fi lens, with Dave Trumbore of Collider writing, "... the subtext here, which is hard to miss even for younger viewers, is that Aja, Krel, and Vex are stand-ins for immigrants, refugees, and "illegal aliens" ... the show is re-examining the actions of the anti-immigrant government agents and the aliens' allies alike."

Accolades

References

External links
 
 3Below: Tales of Arcadia at Netflix
 

2010s American animated television series
2018 American television series debuts
2019 American television series endings
American children's animated adventure television series
American children's animated science fantasy television series
American computer-animated television series
Animated television series about extraterrestrial life
2010s American LGBT-related animated television series
Netflix children's programming
Tales of Arcadia
Television series by DreamWorks Animation
Television series by Universal Television
Television series about royalty
Fictional extraterrestrial–human hybrids
Fictional shapeshifters
Works by Guillermo del Toro
English-language Netflix original programming